The Very Best of the Pogues is a greatest hits album by The Pogues, released in April 2001.

Track listing 	
 "Dirty Old Town" (Ewan MacColl)	
 "The Irish Rover" (featuring The Dubliners) (Traditional)
 "Sally MacLennane" (Shane MacGowan)	
 "Fiesta" (MacGowan, Jem Finer, Edmund Kötscher, Rudi Lindt)	
 "A Pair of Brown Eyes" (MacGowan)	
 "Fairytale of New York" (featuring Kirsty MacColl) (MacGowan, Finer)	
 "The Body of An American" (MacGowan)	
 "Streams of Whiskey" (MacGowan)	
 "The Sick Bed of Cuchulainn" (MacGowan)	
 "If I Should Fall from Grace with God" (MacGowan)	
 "Misty Morning, Albert Bridge" (Finer)	
 "Rain Street" (MacGowan)	
 "White City" (MacGowan)	
 "A Rainy Night In Soho" (MacGowan)	
 "London Girl" (MacGowan)	
 "Boys From The County Hell" (MacGowan)	
 "Sunny Side of the Street" (MacGowan, Finer)	
 "Summer in Siam" (MacGowan)	
 "Hell's Ditch" (MacGowan, Finer)	
 "The Old Main Drag" (MacGowan)	
 "The Band Played Waltzing Matilda" (Eric Bogle)

Certifications

References 	

	

2001 greatest hits albums
The Pogues albums